Bukówka  (German Bukau) is a village in the administrative district of Gmina Słupsk, within Słupsk County, Pomeranian Voivodeship, in northern Poland. 

The village has a population of 352.

References

Villages in Słupsk County